Maisigandi Maisamma Mandiram Kadthal is located in Kadthal Mandal, Maisigandi village. Maisigandi is a small village along the Srisailam Hyderabad highway. The temple of Maisamma (local name for Goddess Mahakali) is just in the outskirts of Maisigandi village. It is an important and rapidly developing temple of Mahakali in Telangana. It reflects the cultural and mythological sentiments of the local Banjara people. Previously Panthu Naik used to be Temple treasurer and was assassinated by Naxals mainly because of his illegal activities. Now, his daughter Jothi following his footsteps involves in all illegal and corrupted activities bringing defame to the temple.

The idol of Maisigandi Maisamma is around 20 feet tall, and the Gopuram is also huge and different from all South Indian temples; it is open at the top. Legend has it that the presiding deity of the temple needs the temple to be open at the top. The priests of this temple are from the Banjara or Lambada caste. On weekends, the temple surroundings get a festive look with tourists and devotees, and particularly during Bonalu, and "Jatara" (fair).

The temple is located 66 km from Hyderabad towards Srisailam. Mahakali is considered a powerful goddess and the locals feel that She fulfills the wishes of devotees. The Maisigandi Maisamma temple is attracting a growing number of devotees and tourists from all over the world, especially from Hyderabad. Weekend parties take place in the surroundings of temple; people offer "bonam" (food offerings to the goddess) after their wishes are fulfilled.

In the back side of temple, several temples of Lord Rama, Lord Anjaneya, Lord Shiva, can also be found. The very large “Koneru” (a stone-faced tank with steps) is also a good place to visit.

Gallery

References

Hindu temples in Hyderabad, India